Portico Row is a set of 16 historic rowhouses located in the Washington Square West neighborhood of Philadelphia, Pennsylvania. The brick houses were built between 1831 and 1832, and designed by Philadelphia architect Thomas Ustick Walter (1804–1887). They have the typical Philadelphia rowhouse plan with front building, piazza, and back building and are in the Greek Revival style. Each of the eight mirror-image pairs shared a common entrance portico supported by Ionic order columns.

It was added to the National Register of Historic Places in 1977.

References

Houses on the National Register of Historic Places in Philadelphia
Greek Revival houses in Pennsylvania
Houses completed in 1832
Washington Square West, Philadelphia